The Belle of New York may refer to:

 The Belle of New York (musical), an 1897 Broadway musical that achieved much greater success in London
 The Belle of New York (1919 film), an adaptation of the musical
 The Belle of New York (1952 film), another adaptation of the musical